The Miss Earth Zambia is a beauty pageant to select a delegate for Miss Earth pageant. The pageant is not related to Miss Universe Zambia or Miss Zambia pageants.

Titleholders
Color key

References

External links
Official page

Zambia
Beauty pageants in Zambia
Recurring events established in 2013
Zambian awards
2013 establishments in Zambia